The Sheikh Abd el-Qurna cache was discovered in 1857 by Alexander Henry Rhind. The tomb is located at the foothills of Sheikh Abd el-Qurna, near TT131. It had been sealed with a wall carrying the seal of Pharaoh Amenhotep III. The tomb contained bones, bandages and several disturbed mummies. It also contained several wooden labels with inscriptions mentioning several royal women.

The label for Princess Nebetia has an inscription mentioning year 27. This is thought to refer to year 27 of Psusennes I during which the princesses may have been reburied.

References

Theban tombs
Eighteenth Dynasty of Egypt